U.S. Route 258 (US 258) is a spur of US 58 in the U.S. states of North Carolina and Virginia.  The U.S. Highway runs  from US 17 Business and NC 24 Business in Jacksonville, North Carolina north to Virginia State Route 143 (SR 143) at Fort Monroe in Hampton, Virginia.  In North Carolina, US 258 connects Jacksonville with the Inner Banks communities of Kinston, Snow Hill, Farmville, Tarboro, and Murfreesboro.  The U.S. Highway continues through the Virginia city of Franklin, where the highway intersects US 58, and the town of Smithfield on its way to the Hampton Roads metropolitan area.  US 258 crosses the James River on the James River Bridge and follows Mercury Boulevard through Newport News and Hampton.

Route description

Jacksonville to Kinston
US 258 begins at a directional intersection with US 17 Business and NC 24 Business in Jacksonville.  The business routes head east together as Marine Boulevard toward downtown Jacksonville; US 17 Business heads southwest along Wilmington Highway to meet up with US 17 along the freeway bypass of Jacksonville that also carries NC 24 and leads to Marine Corps Base Camp Lejeune.  US 258 and NC 24 Business run concurrently along Richlands Highway, a five-lane road with center turn lane, west to the western terminus of the freeway, a four-way intersection at which NC 24 begins to run concurrently with US 258; the west leg of the intersection is NC 53 (Burgaw Highway).  The U.S. Highway and state highway parallel the New River through a junction with the southern end of NC 111 (Lake Catherine Road) to just south of Richlands, where the highways cross the river and pass through that town.  The highways head west out of the town as Kinston Highway.  West of Richlands NC 24 continues west as five-lane Beulaville Highway toward Beulaville while US 258 curves north along Kinston Highway, which reduces to two lanes.

US 258 briefly passes through Jones County, where the highway intersects NC 41 at Hargetts Crossroads before entering Lenoir County.  The U.S. Highway crosses the Trent River and passes through Woodington prior to its junction with US 70 and NC 58 (New Bern Road) just south of the Neuse River in Kinston.  The roadway continues straight as Queen Street, which carries NC 58, US 70 Business, and US 258 Business across the river into downtown Kinston.  US 258 runs concurrently northwest along the US 70 four-lane divided highway; the two U.S. Highways have an intersection with NC 11 and NC 55 (Old Pink Hill Road) before crossing the river and meeting the other end of the highways' business routes, which follow Vernon Avenue.  US 258 and US 70 follow Vernon Avenue a short distance west to where US 258 turns north.  The U.S. Highway has an at-grade crossing with the North Carolina Railroad and meets the western end of NC 148 (C.F. Harvey Parkway), which serves Kinston Regional Jetport and the North Carolina Global TransPark.

Kinston to Tarboro
US 258 crosses Wheat Swamp into Greene County.  The U.S. Highway intersects NC 58 (Kingold Boulevard) again south of Snow Hill, which the highway enters along 2nd Street.  In the center of town, US 258 turns onto Greene Street and crosses Contentnea Creek, then has a four-way intersection with US 13, NC 91, and NC 903.  The roadway continues north as NC 91; US 258 begins to run northeast concurrently with US 13 and NC 903.  NC 903 diverges from the two U.S. Highways west of Maury; the U.S. Highways intersect NC 123 in the hamlet of Lizzie.  US 258 and US 13 diverge north of Sandy Run.  US 258 crosses Middle Swamp into Pitt County and intersects US 264 Alternate south of Farmville. US 258 and US 264 Alternate briefly run together east for  before US 258 heads north again. US 258 comes to a diamond interchange with I-587 and US 264 (John P. East Memorial Highway) and Wesley Chapel Road northeast of the center of Farmville. US 258 joins the I-587 and US 264 freeway west for about  before exiting at another diamond interchange northwest of town. The former routing of the highway through Farmville is now U.S. Route 258 Business.

US 258 intersects NC 222 (Wilson Street) in Fountain before entering Edgecombe County. The U.S. Highway intersects NC 124 in Crisp and NC 42 and NC 43 east of Pinetops, then parallels the Tar River to Tarboro.  South of downtown Tarboro, the U.S. Highway has a partial cloverleaf interchange with the US 64 freeway and Western Boulevard, which features US 64 Alternate, NC 111, and NC 122.  US 258 and the two state highways cross the Tar River on the freeway, then exit US 64 onto Mutual Boulevard at a partial interchange on the east side of the river in Princeville.  There is no access from southbound US 258 to eastbound US 64 or from westbound US 64 to northbound US 258.  The missing movements are provided via NC 33, which the three highways intersect in the center of town.  A short distance to the east, NC 111 diverges on Greenwood Boulevard.  US 258 and NC 122 parallel the river north before the two routes diverge northeast of Tarboro.

Tarboro to Franklin

US 258 intersects NC 97 in the hamlet of Lawrence before the highway enters Halifax County.  The U.S. Highway crosses Deep Creek before becoming the Main Street of Scotland Neck.  US 258 becomes concurrent with NC 125 at the south edge of the town and with NC 903, which enters from the east on 9th Street, in the center of town.  NC 125 and NC 903 exit town to the west on 12th Street.  US 258 has a junction with NC 561 north of Scotland Neck; the two highways cross the Roanoke River into Northampton County.  The two highways meet the northern end of NC 308 just before entering Rich Square as Main Street.  In the center of Rich Square, US 258 intersects NC 305 (Jackson Street), which exits town to the east with NC 561.  The U.S. Highway has an at-grade crossing of the North Carolina and Virginia Railroad southwest of Woodland, where the highway, marked as Main Street, has a concurrency with NC 35 between Spruce Street and Linden Street.

North of Woodland, US 258 crosses Potecasi Creek and parallels the Northampton–Hertford county line north to Murfreesboro.  The U.S. Highway joins US 158 east into Hertford County on its four-lane divided southern bypass of the town while the roadway continues straight as US 158 Business (Main Street).  Southeast of the town, US 258 leaves US 158 and joins NC 11 on Beechwood Boulevard, which the two highways follow to NC 11's northern terminus at US 158 Business.  US 258 leaves Murfreesboro on Virginia Boulevard, which crosses the Meherrin River and heads northeast through Como to the state line, where the highway enters Southampton County, Virginia.  The U.S. Highway, now named Smiths Ferry Road, uses the General Vaughan Bridge to cross the Nottoway River a short distance north of its confluence with the Blackwater River to form the Chowan River.

US 258 meets the western end of SR 189 (Quay Road) before reaching its diamond interchange with US 58 (Southampton Parkway) south of the independent city of Franklin.  US 258 joins US 58 on a four-lane freeway heading east while the roadway continues north into the city as US 258 Business (South Street).  US 258 and US 58 head southeast through a widely spaced partial cloverleaf interchange with SR 714 (Pretlow Street) before crossing the Blackwater River into the city of Suffolk.  East of the river, the U.S. Highways have a partial cloverleaf interchange with SR 189, which joins US 58 heading east toward Norfolk while US 258 exits the freeway and heads north, becoming Great Mill Highway on entering Isle of Wight County southeast of Franklin.  When Great Mill Highway continues north toward an industrial area on the east side of Franklin, US 258 veers northeast on Camp Family Highway, crosses over Norfolk Southern Railway's Franklin District, and meets the northern end of US 258 Business at its intersection with US 58 Business (Carrsville Highway) just north of its grade crossing of CSX's Portsmouth Subdivision rail line and just south of Franklin Municipal-John Beverly Rose Airport.

Franklin to Hampton
US 258 continues northeast as Walters Highway through the hamlet of Walters to the town of Windsor, where the highway is named Prince Boulevard, has a grade crossing of Norfolk Southern's Norfolk District rail line, and intersects US 460 (Windsor Boulevard).  The U.S. Highway continues north as Courthouse Highway through the county seat of Isle of Wight to the town of Smithfield.  US 258 enters the town as Main Street before joining SR 10 on the town's bypass; Main Street continues as US 258 Business.  The two-lane bypass has a diamond interchange with Fairway Drive, then crosses Cypress Creek and collects the northern end of US 258 Business, which runs concurrently with SR 10 Business on Church Street.  US 258 and SR 10 continue southeast on four-lane divided Benns Church Boulevard to Benns Church, where US 258 leaves SR 10 and joins SR 32 on Brewers Neck Boulevard.  The U.S. Highway and state highway follow that boulevard to Carrollton, where the highways join US 17 on Carrollton Boulevard.  The three highways curve northeast and cross the James River on the James River Bridge.

US 258, US 17, and SR 32 enter the city of Newport News on Mercury Boulevard.  The six-lane highway has a partial cloverleaf interchange with US 60 (Warwick Boulevard) and crosses CSX's Peninsula Subdivision rail line before reaching SR 143 (Jefferson Avenue), where SR 32 has its northern terminus.  US 17 turns north onto Jefferson Avenue while US 258 continues east on Mercury Boulevard into the city of Hampton.  At Newmarket Drive south of the former Newmarket North Mall, the U.S. Highway expands to eight lanes and passes through a heavily commercialized area.  East of SR 415 (Power Plant Parkway), US 258 meets Interstate 64 at an interchange featuring a pair of flyover ramps.  The U.S. Highway heads east from the Interstate concurrent with SR 134 as the highway passes between Peninsula Town Center to the north and the Hampton Coliseum to the south.  At the eastern end of the heavily commercialized area, US 258 has intersections with the eastern end of SR 152 (Cunningham Drive) and Armistead Avenue, which heads south as SR 134.

US 258 crosses Newmarket Creek just west of the highway's partial cloverleaf interchange with La Salle Avenue.  The U.S. Highway reduces to six lanes at its diamond interchange with SR 278 (King Street), which serves Langley Air Force Base.  US 258 becomes four lanes at its northern intersection with SR 169, which heads north as Fox Hill Road.  The U.S. Highway crosses the Hampton River and curves south toward its terminus.  US 258 intersects SR 351 (Pembroke Avenue) and Woodland Avenue, which leads to I-64 and downtown Hampton and where the highway reduces to a four-lane undivided street.  The U.S. Highway has another junction with SR 169 (Mallory Street) in the Phoebus neighborhood of Hampton.  At the east edge of Phoebus, US 258 crosses the Mill Creek estuary on a causeway and reaches its northern terminus at an intersection with the southern terminus of SR 143 (Ingalls Road) at the entrance to Fort Monroe.  Ingalls Road continues south onto the former military base at Old Point Comfort that was decommissioned in September 2011.

History

North Carolina Highway 485

Major intersections

Special routes

Kinston business route

U.S. Route 258 Business (US 258 Business) is a business route of US 258 through Kinston, North Carolina.  The highway runs  entirely concurrent with US 70 Business from US 258, US 70, and NC 58 on the south side of Kinston to US 70 and US 258 on the west side of Kinston.  US 258 Business and US 70 Business run concurrently with NC 58 across the Neuse River into downtown Kinston, in the center of which the highways intersect NC 11 and NC 55 (King Street).  North of downtown, the business routes turn west onto Vernon Avenue while NC 58 continues north on Queen Street.  US 258 Business and US 70 Business pass the exhibited remains of the CSS Neuse before they reach their common terminus at a directional intersection with US 258 and US 70.

Snow Hill truck route

U.S. Route 258 Truck (US 258 Truck) is a truck route of US 258 bypassing east of downtown Snow Hill, North Carolina.  The truck route travels , overlapping NC 58, NC 903, and US 13.

Farmville business route

U.S. Route 258 Business (US 258 Business) is business route of US 258 that passes through Farmville, North Carolina. The route is the former mainline routing of US 258 through the town before it was routed onto the US 264 freeway north of the town. US 258 Business begins at the intersection of US 264 Alternate and US 258 within the town limits of Farmville. The route heads north on Main Street to the center of town where it reaches NC 121 (Wilson Street). The two highways form a concurrency and travel west along Wilson Street. After , US 258 Business makes a right turn onto May Boulevard and exits the town. It ends at the US 264's exit 63 which is also where US 258 ends its concurrency with US 264 and returns to surface roads. In October 2022, AASHTO approved a request to eliminate this route.

Franklin business route

U.S. Route 258 Business (US 258 Business) is a business route of US 258 through Franklin, Virginia.  The highway runs  from US 258 and US 58 south of Franklin to US 258 and US 58 Business east of Franklin.  US 258 Business begins at a diamond interchange with the US 58 freeway in Southampton County; the highway immediately enters the city of Franklin as South Street.  The business route passes to the south of the Franklin campus of Paul D. Camp Community College on its way to the downtown area.  Just west of the Blackwater River, US 258 Business curves north onto Main Street, which crosses over CSX's Portsmouth Subdivision rail line.  The business route turns east at Second Street and becomes concurrent with US 58 Business at Mechanic Street.  The two business routes exit the city of Franklin by crossing the Blackwater River into Isle of Wight County.  US 258 Business and US 58 Business continue east as Carrsville Highway through an industrial area.  The business routes parallel the Portsmouth Subdivision and pass under Norfolk Southern Railway's Franklin District before reaching US 258 Business's northern terminus at US 258.  US 58 Business continues east through Carrsville and Holland.

Smithfield business route

U.S. Route 258 Business (US 258 Business) is a business route of US 258 through Smithfield, Virginia.  The highway runs  between intersections with US 258 and SR 10 on the west and south sides of Smithfield.  US 258 Business begins at the junction of US 258 and SR 10; the two highways head south along the bypass of the town while the business route heads into the center of town as Main Street.  The business route joins SR 10 Business on Church Street; the two highways parallel the Pagan River to its junction with Cypress Creek and provide access to Windsor Castle.  After crossing Cypress Creek, US 258 Business and SR 10 Business curve south and expand to a five-lane road with center turn lane that the highways follow to their southern junction with US 258 and SR 10.

Smithfield alternate route

U.S. Route 258 Alternate (US 258 Alternate) is an alternate route of US 258 Business through Smithfield, Virginia.  The highway starts at the southwest end of Grace Street at US 258 Bus on the west side of Smithfield, continues to Church Street, then turns right down Church Street before ending at US 258 Business in downtown Smithfield.

References

External links

NCRoads.com: US 258
Virginia Highways Project: US 258
 Endpoints of U.S. Highway 258

58-2
58-2
58-2
Transportation in Onslow County, North Carolina
Transportation in Jones County, North Carolina
Transportation in Lenoir County, North Carolina
Transportation in Greene County, North Carolina
Transportation in Pitt County, North Carolina
Transportation in Edgecombe County, North Carolina
Transportation in Halifax County, North Carolina
Transportation in Northampton County, North Carolina
Transportation in Hertford County, North Carolina
Transportation in Southampton County, Virginia
Transportation in Suffolk, Virginia
Transportation in Isle of Wight County, Virginia
Transportation in Newport News, Virginia
Transportation in Hampton, Virginia
2
Historic Albemarle Tour